Tallinn Synagogue,, also known as Beit Bella Synagogue, is located in Estonia's capital city. The privately funded synagogue in central Tallinn was inaugurated on May 16, 2007. The building is an ultramodern, airy structure, which can seat 180 people with additional seating for up to 230 people for concerts and other public events. It received global attention as it was the first synagogue to open in Estonia since World War II.

The original synagogue, built in 1883, was not rebuilt after being destroyed in March 1944 during a Soviet air bombing raid on Tallinn, which at the time was occupied by Nazi Germany - the city then became the only post-war European capital without a synagogue. Tartu, a university city in southeastern Estonia and the second largest city in Estonia, also had a synagogue (Tartu Synagogue) which was destroyed during World War II.

See also
History of the Jews in Estonia

References

External links

 The official Site of Tallinn Synagogue
Estonia's first synagogue since World War II opens, European Jewish Press
 Synagogue set to open in Estonia for first time since Holocaust, Federation of Jewish Communities of the CIS
First Post-World War Two Synagogue Opened in Tallinn, Estonia, European Jewish Congress
 Estonia's Jews set to inaugurate new Tallinn synagogue, International Herald Tribune
 Peres, Metzger Attend Opening of First Estonian Synagogue, Arutz 7
Synagogue set to open in Estonia for first time since Holocaust, Haaretz
Estonia opens synagogue for first time since Nazi era, The Independent
Estonia Jews to get first synagogue, Aljazeera.net

Religious buildings and structures in Tallinn
Synagogues in Estonia
2007 establishments in Estonia
Synagogues completed in 2007
Orthodox Judaism in Europe
Orthodox synagogues